Thomas Robert Hickey (born February 8, 1989) is a Canadian former professional ice hockey defenceman who played for the New York Islanders of the National Hockey League (NHL).

Early life
Hickey is a high school graduate of the Edge School in Calgary, Alberta.

Playing career
Hickey joined the Seattle Thunderbirds of the Western Hockey League (WHL) in 2004–05 in a limited role for 5 games. The following season, in 2005–06, he tallied 28 points as a rookie. In his draft year, in 2006–07, Hickey improved to 9 goals and 50 points. He was then drafted in the off-season by the Los Angeles Kings in the first round, fourth overall, in the 2007 NHL Entry Draft. On July 17, 2007, he signed a three-year, entry-level contract with the Kings. Attending the Kings' training camp, he was returned to the Thunderbirds on September 21, 2007, for a third junior season. During the 2008–09 season, Hickey suffered an ankle injury that required surgery after the season. In November 2009, he suffered a shoulder injury that would also require surgery and keep him off the ice until April 1, 2010. Not much later, one game before the Monarchs would begin their playoff run for the 2009–10 season, Hickey sprained his ankle and was unable to play until the semi-finals, when the Monarchs lost to the Hershey Bears. During his time with the Monarchs, Hickey was named an alternate captain.

On January 15, 2013, Hickey was claimed off waivers from the Kings by the New York Islanders. He immediately joined the team during the 2012–13 training camp. He made his NHL debut with the Islanders on January 27, 2013, against the Winnipeg Jets at the MTS Centre. On February 21, 2013, Hickey scored his first NHL goal, an overtime winner against the Montreal Canadiens at the Bell Centre.

In the 2015–16 season, Hickey scored the overtime winner against the Washington Capitals, and with that goal the Islanders clinched a playoff spot in the 2016 Stanley Cup playoffs. Just two weeks later, Hickey scored his first playoff goal in Game 3 in overtime against the Florida Panthers on a pass from Brock Nelson, giving the Islanders a 2–1 series lead. On July 1, 2018, Hickey signed a four-year contract with the Islanders.

Heading into the 2019-20 season, having lost his spot during the  season due to injury and the subsequent emergence of Devon Toews, coupled with the Islanders needing an NHL roster spot for Noah Dobson, Hickey was waived and sent to play for the Bridgeport Sound Tigers. Despite being limited to just 14 games for the Sound Tigers, Hickey was the Islanders nominee for the Bill Masterton Memorial Trophy in the 2019–20 season following the death of his older brother, Dan.

Hickey played out the remaining three-years of his contract within the Islanders organization mostly with AHL affiliate, the Bridgeport Islanders. During his final professional season, Hickey was loaned by the Islanders to finish his career with the Ontario Reign of the AHL, affiliate of his original NHL club, the Los Angeles Kings.

International play

During his third year of major junior, Hickey was chosen to represent Canada for the 2008 World Junior Championships in the Czech Republic, where he helped Canada to a fourth consecutive gold medal. He was selected the next year for the 2009 World Junior Championships in Ottawa as the team captain, returning with John Tavares, P. K. Subban and Zach Boychuk from the previous year's team. In the third game of preliminaries, he was chosen as Canada's player of the game in a 5–1 win against Germany. Canada went on to beat Sweden in the finals for the third straight year to capture its fifth consecutive WJHC gold medal.

Broadcasting career
Following a 12 year professional playing career, Hickey effectively announced his retirement in joining the MSG Network's New York Islanders broadcast team on October 27, 2022.

Career statistics

Regular season and playoffs

International

Awards and honours

References

External links
 

1989 births
Living people
Bridgeport Islanders players
Bridgeport Sound Tigers players
Canadian ice hockey defencemen
Los Angeles Kings draft picks
Manchester Monarchs (AHL) players
National Hockey League first-round draft picks
New York Islanders players
Ontario Reign (AHL) players
Seattle Thunderbirds players
Ice hockey people from Calgary